The Tournament of Nations was a global invitational tournament for national teams in women's soccer in non-World Cup and non-Olympic years hosted by the United States Soccer Federation (USSF) in several American cities. The inaugural tournament was held in 2017.

The 2021 edition would have been a pre-Olympics tournament due to the rescheduling of the Tokyo Olympics. On May 6, 2021, however, the USSF announced that it would no longer hold Tournament of Nations because recent changes in international windows by FIFA made a round-robin tournament unfeasible.

Format
The tournament had been an invitational event, allowing four nations to compete against one another. The tournament was conducted via a round-robin system, with the nation finishing at the top of the table being declared the tournament champions. The format was the same as the other women's invitational event run by the USSF, the SheBelieves Cup.

Results

General statistics

Top goalscorers

See also

 FIFA Women's World Cup
 Football at the Summer Olympics (Women's tournament)
 Algarve Cup
 Arnold Clark Cup
 China Cup
 Cup of Nations
 Cyprus Women's Cup
 Four Nations Tournament
 Istria Cup
 Pinatar Cup
 SheBelieves Cup
 Tournament of Nations
 Tournoi de France
 Turkish Women's Cup
 Women's Revelations Cup
 Yongchuan International Tournament

References

External links
Official website, USSoccer.com 

 
International women's association football competitions hosted by the United States
International women's association football invitational tournaments
Recurring sporting events established in 2017
2017 establishments in the United States